Skyles was an unincorporated community in Webster County, West Virginia.

The community takes its name from nearby Skyles Creek.

References 

Unincorporated communities in West Virginia
Unincorporated communities in Webster County, West Virginia